The discography of Alexander O'Neal consists of nine studio albums, three live albums, nine compilation albums and thirty seven singles.

Discography

Studio albums

Live albums
Live at the Hammersmith Apollo – London (2005, Eminence)
Live in Minneapolis (2011, CC Entertainment)
Live at the Palladium (2019, independent digital release)

Compilation albums

Singles

References

O'Neal, Alexander